The following television stations broadcast on digital or analog channel 21 in Canada:

 CBMT-DT in Montreal, Quebec
 CBRT-DT in Calgary, Alberta
 CHNB-TV-12 in St. Stephen, New Brunswick
 CHNU-DT-1 in Victoria, British Columbia
 CIHF-TV-15 in Antigonish, Nova Scotia
 CJON-DT in St. John's, Newfoundland and Labrador
 CJWM-TV in Whistler, British Columbia
 CKRT-DT-4 in Cabano, Quebec

21 TV stations in Canada